Hajjiabad (also Romanized as Ḩājjīābād) is a village in Bizaki Rural District, Golbajar District, Chenaran County, Razavi Khorasan Province, Iran. At the 2006 census, its population was 58, in 12 families.

References 

Populated places in Chenaran County